Gachas is an ancestral basic dish from central and southern Spain. Its main ingredients are flour, water, olive oil, garlic, paprika and salt.

Origin
Gachas are based on a very ancient Iberian flour-based staple food preparation.
Gachas may have different consistencies, from a liquid soup to a pie-like thick cake with a golden crust. The way of preparing them changes from area to area and from family to family.

Gachas is considered an unrefined rural dish, the food of shepherds, farmers and itinerant labourers. It has been also described as a "fundamental Gitano dish".
The gachas have largely been ousted by rice and potato dishes in most areas of Spain during the 20th century, especially in the towns and cities. Consumption of this simple dish resurfaced again during economic downturns and upheavals, like the Spanish Civil War, earning it the name gachas de los años difíciles (gachas of the hard years). Certain modern chefs argue, though, that well-prepared gachas are not necessarily a coarse dish.

As an Iberian dish, gachas are often served with pork products, like salted or fresh bacon, liver, lung, chorizo, salchichón, or morcilla, among others.

Variations

Andalucía

Andalusian gachas, gachas andaluzas, are traditionally made of wheat flour.  The traditional way of cooking them consists in frying garlic slices in olive oil until they are golden. Then the flour is added by sprinkling it over the hot oil with one hand and mixing well with the spoon until the mixture is slightly roasted. Water is added then, pouring it very slowly, while stirring the mixture all the while without interrupting the bubbling. Salt and water are added to taste and desired consistency, the gachas being ready when they "smell cooked".

There are many variations of the gachas in Andalusia itself, as the sweet poleá, the gachas colorás flavoured with paprika or saffron, or the gachas de matanza (butchery gachas), served with a stew with curdled blood, liver and offal. Fried onion and bread croutons may be also added in certain regions.

Castilla-La Mancha

The gachas manchegas or gachas de almorta are cooked with flour made from grass peas (Lathyrus sativus). Accompaniments for the dish vary throughout La Mancha. It was generally consumed during the cold winter months. The dish is generally eaten directly out of the pan it was cooked in, using either a spoon or a simple slice of bread.

This dish is commonly consumed immediately after removing it from the fire, being careful not to burn one's lips or tongue.

Grass pea flour is exceedingly difficult to obtain outside of Castilla-La Mancha, especially in its pure form. Commercial forms are mixed with wheat flour because grass peas are toxic if consistently consumed as a staple.

The gachas serranas of Cuenca are a local variant, usually served with mushrooms and potatoes (Called zarangullo). In the comarca of la Serranía, stewed and pickled pork liver and lug is added to the gachas when the water is added, or is eaten intecalating with the own gachas. Other possible accompaniments include hot chilis or baby cucumbers in vinegar.

The gachas murcianas of the Murcia region are a variation of the gachas manchegas spiked with caraway (Carum carvi), black pepper and cloves.

Valencia and Aragon
A type of gachas made with corn flour are popular in the area of Ademuz, in the comarca of Rincón de Ademuz, a Valencian enclave in the eastern fringes of the ancient New Castile. These gachas are generally mixed with pork or cod, as well as tomatoes and snails. The dish is part of the traditional cuisine of the area, in addition to the grass pea gachas of neighboring La Mancha that are eaten in Ademuz as well. In the Valencian Ports mountain region further northeast, a similar dish is known locally as Farro.

In Aragon the same dish may be also called gachas, but more often it is referred to by the local name of farinetas. It is prepared by frying thick pieces of bacon in olive oil and taking them off the pan when they have released some fat. Then water and fine corn flour are added to the same pan, slowly stirring the mixture until it is cooked. The proportion is roughly 250 g of flour, 150 g of bacon, 1 liter of water, three large spoonfuls of extra virgin olive oil and a teaspoonful of salt.

Gachas as a dessert
It is common in Andalusia to prepare Gachas dulces (sweet gachas), a sweet version of the dish which can be served as a dessert. The ingredients are olive oil, flour and water, like in the traditional gachas, but adding sugar instead of garlic and salt. They may be cooked with milk instead of water. Sweet gachas may be seasoned with honey, vanilla, orange peel and cinnamon. The dish may be eaten with raisins, almonds or bread croutons.

The gachas extremeñas (also known as "puchas dulces") are a dessert from Extremadura flavored with anise (Pimpinella anisum). In this dish breadcrumbs are added to the mixture during the cooking.

See also
 Gachas migas
 List of porridges
List of Spanish dishes

References

External links

Receta de gachas manchegas 
Gachas dulces  
Traditional recipe of gachas. Take a taste of Andalucia, Spain

Ancient dishes
Spanish cuisine
Andalusian cuisine
Valencian cuisine
Castilian-La Mancha cuisine
Extremaduran cuisine
Porridges